Yajaira Cristina Vera Roldán is a Venezuelan model and beauty pageant titleholder who was Miss Venezuela 1988 and a Top 10 finalist at Miss Universe 1988.

Vera competed in 1988 as Miss Miranda in her country's national beauty pageant, Miss Venezuela, capturing the crown and the right to represent her country at Miss Universe 1988.  In that pageant, held in Taipei, Taiwan on May 23, 1988, she placed as one of the Top 10 finalists.

General references 

Living people
Year of birth missing (living people)
Place of birth missing (living people)
Miss Universe 1988 contestants